Top Star U-back is a 2018 South Korean television series starring Kim Ji-seok, Jeon So-min and Lee Sang-yeob. It aired once a week on Fridays from November 16, 2018 to February 1, 2019 at 23:00 KST on tvN.

Synopsis
The story of a narcissistic, former idol and A-list actor who is banished to a remote island after causing some major trouble. While struggling to adapt to his new surroundings, he eventually strikes up a romance with an islander who has very little in common.

Casts

Main
 Kim Ji-seok as Yoo Baek
 Ji Min-hyuk as young Yoo Baek
 A narcissistic A-list actor and former idol. After causing some major trouble, Yoo Baek is forced to lie low for a while, and he ends up leaving Seoul for a temporary stay on a remote island. 
 Jeon So-min as Oh Kang-soon
 An unsophisticated, tough-as-nails islander who is unpredictable but bright and optimistic. She is hardworking and does not care about anything aside from her studies, her work as a diver, or the supermarket she runs. 
 Lee Sang-yeob as Choi Ma-dol 
 A sailor and the top star of Yeojeuk Island, who makes a glorious return home on a deep-sea fishing vessel

Supporting
 Jung Eun-pyo as Kim Gook-seop
Dong-choon's father
 Jung Yi-rang as Lee Hyang-gi
Dong-choon's mother
 Huh Jin as Jang Heung-deuk
 Song Byung-suk as Goon San-deuk
 Lee Han-wi as Choi Han-bong
Choi Ma-dol's father
 Kim Hyun as Yang Bang-sil
Choi Ma-dol's mother
 Yoo Joo-won as Park Dong-man
 Kim Jung-min as Kang Min
Teacher of island
 Lee Ah-hyun as Ah Seo-ra/Ashura
Only doctor of island, have a crush on Kang Min
 Ye Soo-jung as Kang-soon's grandmother
 Jung Ji-yoon as Cha-e
 Jo Hee-bong as Seo-il
Yoo Baek's CEO
 Huh Jung-min as Nam Jo
Yoo Baek's rival
 Kim Min-suk as Park Dong-choon
Yoo Baek's manager
 Yoon Bok-in as Yoo Baek's mother
 Kwon Hyuk as Min-hyeok

Special appearances
 Baek Il-seob as himself (Ep. 1)
 Han Suk-joon as MC in ceremony (Ep. 1)
 Hong Yun-hwa as woman in police station (Ep. 1)
 Im Soo-hyang as herself (Ep. 3)
 Yoo In-na as radio host DJ (Ep. 5, voice only)
 Nam Bo-ra as Noh Hae-won (Ep. 7, 11)
 Yang Se-chan (Ep. 11)
 Kang Hong-seok as Detective when Yoo Baek refused breathalyzer test

Production
The first script reading for the drama was held on September 5, 2018 with the attendance of cast and crew.

Original soundtrack

Part 1

Part 2

Part 3

Ratings

References

External links
  
 

TVN (South Korean TV channel) television dramas
Korean-language television shows
2018 South Korean television series debuts
2019 South Korean television series endings
South Korean romance television series